Show Me How to Live is the eleventh studio album by Royal Hunt. The album marks the return of American singer D.C. Cooper after thirteen years away from the band, as well as the band's return to "classic Royal Hunt sound".

Track listing
All songs written by André Andersen.

 "One More Day" - 6:12
 "Another Man Down" - 5:13
 "An Empty Shell" - 4:32
 "Hard Rain's Coming" - 5:12
 "Half Past Loneliness" - 5:36
 "Show Me How to Live" - 10:03
 "Angel's Gone" - 5:12

Personnel

Band members
D.C. Cooper – vocals
Jonas Larsen – guitars
André Andersen – keyboards, producer
Andreas Passmark – bass
Allan Sørensen - drums

Additional musicians
Kenny Lubcke, Maria McTurk, Alexandra Popova, Michelle Raitzin - backing vocals

Production
Mixed at Roasting House Studios in Malmö, Sweden
Recorded at North Point Studio, Denmark. 
Mastering by Jan Eliasson at AudioPlanet in Copenhagen
Album cover by Kai Brockschmidt

Reception
In Trucking magazine's regular music reviews Shaun Connors wrote, "Music with balls for people with balls," suggesting listeners "Forget Royal Hunt’s pigeonholing prog rock/metal moniker and for SMHTL think more hardish rock with mild symphonic (keyboard-laden) twist, all enhanced by stadium rock level melody and hooks..."

About.com gave the album a four-of-five star rating, commenting: "Royal Hunt does a good job combining hooks and melodies with more intricate arrangements. Songs like “Another Man Down” is memorable and catchy, but also has depth and atmosphere along with some quality guitar work from Jonas Larsen, who has a positive impact on his first album with Royal Hunt."

Charts

References

External links
Blabbermouth
Royal Hunt

Royal Hunt albums
2011 albums
Frontiers Records albums